The High Court of Cassation and Justice is Romania's supreme court, and the court of last resort. It is the equivalent of France's Cour de Cassation and serves a similar function to other courts of cassation around the world.

Naming history 
It held various names during its existence: "Curtea Supremă" (Supreme Court) and "Tribunalul Suprem" (Supreme Tribunal) during the Communist period (1948–1952 and 1952–1989 respectively), and "Curtea Supremă de Justiție" (Supreme Court of Justice) from 1990 to 2003. The name "Înalta Curte de Casație și Justiție" was re-introduced in 2003, having been also used during the United Principalities (1862–1881) and Kingdom of Romania (1881–1947).

Administration 
The court is led by a president, seconded by a vice-president and the leading council. Since September 2019, its president is Corina-Alina Corbu. The general assembly of the court's judges assigns two members for the Superior Council of Magistrature. The same assembly approves the annual activity report (released publicly) and the budget of the institution.

According to the law, "The president, the vice-president and the section presidents of the High Court of Cassation and Justice are named by the President of Romania, at the proposal of the Superior Council of Magistrature, out of the judges of the High Court that have worked in at this instance for at least two years". The term lasts for three years, with the possibility of being renewed once.

List of Court Presidents

See also
Judiciary of Romania
Constitutional Court of Romania

References

External links

Courts in Romania
Romania
1861 establishments in Romania